Infanta María Luisa Fernanda of Spain, Duchess of Montpensier (30 January 1832 – 2 February 1897) was the younger daughter of King Ferdinand VII of Spain and his fourth wife and niece, Maria Christina of the Two Sicilies. She became Duchess of Montpensier by marriage to her first cousin once removed, Antoine, Duke of Montpensier.

Biography

Heiress-presumptive

When her elder sister Isabella II of Spain succeeded to the throne, Infanta Luisa Fernanda was heir presumptive to the crown between 1833 and 1851, when Isabella's oldest surviving daughter was born.

Marriage
Luisa Fernanda was engaged to the Duke of Montpensier, the youngest son of King Louis Philippe, who also was Luisa's mother's first cousin.

Luisa Fernanda, only 14 years old, and Antoine, 22, had their nuptials on 10 October 1846 as a double wedding with Isabella and Francis, and young Antoine was elevated to the rank of an Infante of Spain. The couple moved to Paris and later to Sevilla. The relationship between Isabella and her sister was tense, due to Antoine's conspiracies against the queen.

Antoine's father was deposed in 1848. The same year, the then 16-year-old Luisa Fernanda gave birth to their first child, Maria Isabel. After Isabella was deposed, the family went into exile. Luisa returned to Sevilla years later, already widowed, where she died. She is buried at Escorial.

The María Luisa Park was named after her.

Children

Luisa Fernanda and Antoine had nine children, but only six of them reached adulthood.

 Infanta Maria Isabel (1848–1919); married her first cousin Prince Philippe, Count of Paris (1838–1894), the French claimant, and became known as Madame the comtesse de Paris. She had several children, including Princess Louise of Orléans, the maternal grandmother of King Juan Carlos I.
 Infanta Maria Amelia (1851–1870)
 Infanta Maria Cristina (1852–1879); after her younger sister Mercedes died, she was engaged to King Alfonso XII (1857–1885), five years her junior, but she died before the wedding.
 Infanta Maria de la Regla (1856–1861)
 [?] (1857–1857)
 Infante Fernando (1859–1873)
 Infanta Maria de las Mercedes (1860–1878), otherwise Princess Marie des Graces d'Orleans-Montpensier, who married her first cousin Alfonso XII and is historically known as Mercedes of Orléans, Queen of Spain. Had no children.
 Infante Felipe Raimundo Maria (1862–1864)
 Infante Antonio, Duke of Galliera (1866–1930); became Duke of Galliera in Italy. He married his first cousin Infanta Eulalia of Spain (1864–1958), daughter of Isabella II, and had two sons: Infante Alfonso and Infante Luís.
 Infante Luis Maria Felipe Antonio (1867–1874)

Descendants

Of all her children, only Marie Isabelle and  Antonio survived to adulthood. Through Antonio, the now non-royal line of dukes of Galliera continues. Alfonso's grandchildren lost royal status due to non-dynastic marriages. The current Duke of Galliera is Alfonso's great-grandson, Don Alfonso Francesco de Orléans-Borbón y Ferarra-Pignatelli.

Through Maria Isabel, she became great-grandmother of king Manuel II of Portugal, Amedeo, Duke of Aosta, Aimone, Duke of Spoleto, and Luis Filipe, Duke of Braganza; great-great-grandmother of Juan Carlos I of Spain and Henri, Count of Paris.

Arms

Ancestry

References

Spanish infantas
Luisa Fernanda
1832 births
1897 deaths
Luisa Fernanda
Burials in the Pantheon of Infantes at El Escorial
Luisa Fernanda
French princesses
French duchesses
19th-century French people
19th-century Spanish people
Daughters of kings